Oleg Caetani (born 5 October 1956) is an Italian conductor.

Life and career 
Born in Lausanne, Caetani studied with Nadia Boulanger. At the Conservatory of Santa Cecilia in Rome, he studied conducting with Franco Ferrara and composition with Irma Ravinale.  He made his debut at age 17 with a production of Claudio Monteverdi's Il combattimento di Tancredi e Clorinda.  He then attended the Moscow Conservatory to study conducting with Kirill Kondrashin and musicology with Nadezhda Nikolaeva.  He graduated from the St Petersburg Conservatory in conducting with Ilya Musin.

Caetani won the RAI Competition in 1979 and the third prize at the Karajan Competition in Berlin in 1982. He started his professional career at the Staatsoper Unter den Linden in Berlin.  He was then Chief Conductor at the Nationaltheater Weimar, First Kapelllmeister  at the Frankfurt Opera, Music Director first at the Hessisches Staatstheater Wiesbaden, later at the Chemnitz Opera and Robert Schumann Philharmonic Orchestra.

In 2001 Caetani conducted at La Scala, Milan  Turandot and  Otello in 2005.  His first conducting appearance with English National Opera (ENO) was in 2003 with Khovanshchina, then he was Chief Designate in 2005 and came back for Sir John in Love in 2006. Since then he maintains a strong regular presence at the ENO.  
Caetani made his Australian conducting debut in 2001 with the Melbourne Symphony Orchestra (MSO).  In January 2005, he became the MSO's Chief Conductor and Artistic Director.  In 2007 he led the MSO on its second European tour, which took in performances in major centres including Berlin, Madrid, Milan and Paris (first time in history that an Australian orchestra played in those European capitals). In March 2008, the MSO announced the extension of Caetani's contract through to the end of 2010.  He led the MSO in the Australian premieres of Brahms' Serenade No. 1, works by Enescu, Bartók, Schoenberg, Walton, Ravel, and Shostakovich's Symphonies No. 2 and No. 13 (Babi Yar) on 7 August 2008.  His recording projects with the MSO include all the symphonies of Alexandre Tansman and the orchestral works of Rudi Stephan.
He is regular guest at the Mariinsky Theatre where he has conducted the Russian Premiere of The Prisoner by Dallapiccola at the White Night Festival in 2015, etc.

Caetani's recordings include the first complete cycle of the Shostakovich symphonies recorded by an Italian orchestra, with the Orchestra Sinfonica di Milano Giuseppe Verdi, Poliuto by Donizetti with Carreras,  Ricciarelli and the Wiener Symphoniker, the symphonic cycles by Tchaikovsky and Gounod (Diapason d'or ), a CD with Wagner overtures and another one with various Mendelssohn works.

Caetani received the Berlioz medal for his interpretation of Benvenuto Cellini and the Romanian Legion of Honour for culture merite because of his work to increase Enesco's popularity outside Romania.

Family 
Caetani was born the son of the conductor and composer Igor Markevitch (1912-1983) and his second wife Donna Topazia Caetani (1921–1990), who is descended from a very old aristocratic Roman family that included the early 14th-century Pope Boniface VIII. Caetani has chosen to use his mother's family name to continue its lineage.

References

External links
 artist info
 Klassika German-language page on Caetani
 Melbourne Symphony Orchestra biography of Caetani

1956 births
Living people
Italian male conductors (music)
Swiss people of Italian descent
Swiss people of Russian descent
Moscow Conservatory alumni
Saint Petersburg Conservatory alumni
Swiss people of Ukrainian descent
Swiss conductors (music)
Male conductors (music)
People from Lausanne
20th-century Italian conductors (music)
21st-century Italian conductors (music)
20th-century Italian male musicians
21st-century Italian male musicians